Information Overload Unit is the 1981 debut full-length album by the Australian industrial band SPK. Originally released in 1981 by Side Effects, it was re-released twice; in 1985 by Normal, and in 1992 by The Grey Area.

Track listing

Side A (aka Face ULTRA)
 "Emanation Machine R. Gie 1916" – 5:24
 "Suture Obsession" – 5:06
 "Macht Schrecken" – 5:19
 "Beruftverböt" – 5:31

Side B (aka Face HYPER)
 "Ground Zero: Infinity Dose" – 4:18
 "Stammheim Torturkammer" – 4:33
 "Retard" – 4:26
 "Epilept: Convulse" – 2:33
 "Kaltbruchig Acideath" – 4:32

Personnel
According to the band's official website 
Operator - synthesizers, rhythms, treatments, vocals
Mike Wilkins - guitar, bass, tapes, vocals
Tone Generator (Dominic Guerin) - synthesizers, treatments
Mr. Clean (Ashley Revell) - technician

Release history

Notes

1981 debut albums
SPK (band) albums